Rejinagar is a village in the Beldanga II CD block in the Berhampore subdivision of Murshidabad district in the state of West Bengal, India.

Geography

Location

Area overview
The area shown in the map alongside, covering Berhampore and Kandi subdivisions, is spread across both the natural physiographic regions of the district, Rarh and Bagri. The headquarters of Murshidabad district, Berhampore, is in this area. The entire area is overwhelmingly rural with over 80% of the population living in the rural areas.

Note: The map alongside presents some of the notable locations in the subdivisions. All places marked in the map are linked in the larger full screen map.

Demographics
According to the 2011 Census of India, Rejinagar had a total population of 10,103, of which 5,146 (51%) were males and 4,957 (49%) were females. Population in the age range 0–6 years was 1,729. The total number of literate persons in Rejinagar was 5,653 (67.51% of the population over 6 years).

Civic administration

Police station
Rejinagar police station has jurisdiction over a part of Beldanga II CD block.

Transport
National Highway 12 (old number NH 34) passes through Rejinagar.

Rejinagar railway station on the  Ranaghat-Lalgola branch line which was opened in 1905.

Education
 Kashipur Tarini Sundari Vidyapith.

References

Villages in Murshidabad district